USS Zeus has been the name of more than one United States Navy ship, and may refer to:

 (formerly LST-132), a Aristaeus-class repair ship, commissioned 1944 and struck 1973, currently in service as Gordon Jensen, a seafood processing ship.
, a cable repair ship operated by the Military Sealift Command, delivered in 1984.

United States Navy ship names